Roman Knoll (‘Romanska Mogila’ \'ro-man-ska mo-'gi-la\) is the ice-covered hill rising to 819 m between Mount Canicula and Erul Heights, on the southeast side of Verdikal Gap on Trinity Peninsula in Graham Land, Antarctica.  It is surmounting Russell East Glacier to the southeast.

The hill is named after the town of Roman in Northwestern Bulgaria.

Location
German-British mapping in 1996.

Maps
 Trinity Peninsula. Scale 1:250000 topographic map No. 5697. Institut für Angewandte Geodäsie and British Antarctic Survey, 1996.
 Antarctic Digital Database (ADD). Scale 1:250000 topographic map of Antarctica. Scientific Committee on Antarctic Research (SCAR). Since 1993, regularly updated.

Notes

References
 Roman Knoll. SCAR Composite Antarctic Gazetteer
 Bulgarian Antarctic Gazetteer. Antarctic Place-names Commission. (details in Bulgarian, basic data in English)

External links
 Roman Knoll. Copernix satellite image

Hills of Trinity Peninsula
Bulgaria and the Antarctic